Franklyn Baur (April 5, 1903 – February 24, 1950) was a popular tenor vocal recording artist.

Baur was born in New York and educated at Amherst. At 19, he was selected from over 50 candidates as principal tenor in the Park Avenue Baptist Church known as the John D. Rockefeller Church. His grandfather on the maternal side held the same position for many years in Henry Ward Beecher's Brooklyn church.

Recording career
Baur made hundreds of recordings for about a dozen different recording companies, including the three major labels, Victor, Columbia and Brunswick. His first recording, If the Rest of the World Don't Want You, was for Victor in 1923. Baur recorded for Victor as a featured soloist; as one of the vocalists for Nat Shilkret and the Victor Orchestra; with Roger Wolfe Kahn and His Orchestra; and on occasion, as the vocalist for Paul Whiteman's orchestra, with many of his recordings being listed by Joel Whitburn as "charted." The Encyclopedic Discography of Victor Recordings (EDVR) lists detailed information for Baur's Victor recordings.

Baur first recorded for Columbia in 1924, with many more Columbia recordings to follow, and for other labels, including Brunswick, Banner, Domino, Emerson, Gennett, Grey Gull, Puritan, Oriole, and Regal, often using pseudonyms.

Radio and other performances
Baur's first stage appearance was in the Ziegfeld Follies of 1927, in which he was a featured vocalist. The show starred Eddie Cantor.

Baur became the highest salaried ballad singer on the radio during the 1920s.

Today's audiences may know Baur best as a member of The Revelers, an extremely popular group of the 1920s (four singers and a pianist). Their short musical film, The Revelers (1927), was produced by Warner Bros. and recently released on DVD. Members of the group had been recording as The Shannon Four when pianist Frank Black recruited Baur and wrote new, jazz-oriented arrangements. The group's new sound, highlighted by Baur's enthusiastic vocals (embellished with his own syncopated effects and punctuations) revitalized the group, which soared in popularity. (A 1928 estimate by Victor Records reported that The Revelers typically sold 71,900 copies of any given record, while the label's other vocal stars sold as few as 10,740 copies.) The Revelers with Baur also sang under numerous pseudonyms and sponsorships. Baur left The Revelers in the fall of 1927. 

Baur's most notable radio broadcasts were for the well-known Voice of Firestone (initially titled The Firestone Hour). He was one of the soloists on Firestone's first broadcast in December 1928 and remained with Firestone through May 1930, after which his contract was not renewed because he had asked for compensation, in addition to his generous weekly broadcast fee, to perform at a company function.

Following his dismissal by Firestone, Baur's career declined. In 1931, he went to France to take voice lessons, and he gave a recital in December 1933 at Town Hall in New York City. His record producer, Gus Haenschen, recalled: "He toured as a recitalist for another two years, maybe more, but as happened with other pop-music tenors before him, he sang too often — he was still on radio, too — and some of the arias he chose for his recitals were wrong for his voice. He developed a nodule on one of his vocal cords, and unfortunately the operation to remove the node wasn’t successful and left him with an impaired voice. That’s what shortened his career."

Personal life

Franklyn Baur died on February 24, 1950, at the age of 46 of a heart ailment at his home in New York City.

References

External links
 Franklyn Baur recordings at the Discography of American Historical Recordings.

American tenors
1903 births
1950 deaths
Gennett Records artists
20th-century American singers
Victor Records artists
Columbia Records artists
Brunswick Records artists
20th-century American male singers
Johnny Hamp's Kentucky Serenaders members